KakaoTalk (Hangul: 카카오톡), commonly referred to as KaTalk (Hangul: 카톡) in South Korea, is a mobile messaging app for smartphones operated by Kakao Corporation. It was launched on March 18, 2010, and it is available on mobile and desktop platforms.

, KakaoTalk had 53 million monthly active users, 47 million inside Korea. It is available in 15 languages. The app is also used by 93% of smartphone owners in South Korea, where it is the most widely used messaging app for smart phones and personal computers.

After the COVID-19 pandemic, it has further grown in prominence after becoming widely used as a tool to combat COVID-19, in cooperation with the South Korean government.

Service 
KakaoTalk provides free calling and messaging services. Like most of its type, the user is able to share photos, videos, voice messages, locations, webpage links, and contact information. Users are able to create one-on-one conversations, as well as group chats with no limit on users. It allows the user to synchronize contact lists to connect to friends who also use the service, among other options that provide this service.

The app automatically synchronizes the user's contact list on their smartphones with the contact list on the app to find friends who are on the service. Users can also search for friends by KakaoTalk ID without having to know their phone numbers. The KakaoTalk service also allows its users to export their messages and save them.

KakaoTalk began as a messenger service but has become a platform for the distribution of various third-party content and apps, including hundreds of games, which users can download and play with their friends through the messaging platform. Through the "Plus Friend" feature, users can follow brands, media and celebrities to receive exclusive messages, coupons and other real-time information through KakaoTalk chatrooms. Users can also purchase real-life goods through the messenger's "Gifting" platform.

On January 13, 2021, KakaoTalk released an emoticon monthly fixed-rate service. "Emoticon Plus" is a service that allows unlimited use of Kakao's selected collection of emoticons for ₩3,900 per month. After subscribing to 'KakaoTalk Wallet', users purchase Emoticon Plus through the wallet platform rather than through in-app payment.

Company business model

KakaoTalk, a free mobile messenger application for smartphones, revealed its first profits of $42 million in 2012 and $200 million in revenue for 2013. With 93% of South Korea's population using KakaoTalk on their smartphones, Kakao Corp. has provided users a large range of services including games and retail commerce.

History

Government surveillance 
Following criticism of the South Korean government's response to the Sewol Ferry Disaster, Korean authorities announced a "zero-tolerance policy" which involved investigation and detention of individuals deemed to be spreading libel through Internet media. Some KakaoTalk users have received notices that their messaging accounts were searched by South Korean authorities.

Coronavirus vaccine passports and contact tracing 
Until early-2022, when the South Korean government relaxed COVID-19 laws, KakaoTalk effectively functioned as one of South Korea's digital vaccine passport platforms (along with several other platforms). It was used as a storage for mandatory COVID vaccine data, and individuals entering public venues were required to have their vaccination information scanned via QR codes by the venue.

Since the identitiy of individuals at a venue were available as contact tracing data, KakaoTalk also served as a tool for contract tracing by the Korean government until its vaccine passport functionality was discontinued.

Safebot 
Kakao has taken steps to make KakaoTalk a safer platform. In December 2020, KakaoTalk introduced Safebot, an AI-based comment-filtering function. The function automatically filters comments that violate KakaoTalk’s operational policies such as profanity. Profanity is covered with musical notes, and comments that may be offensive are marked with a warning. According to a press release published by Kakao on December 14, 2022, the quality of KakaoTalk comment culture has improved since the introduction of Safebot. From the second half of 2020 before the introduction of Safebot to 2022, comments containing profanity were reduced by one-third. In the same time period, the proportion of abusive comments reported by users among all comments decreased from 4.2% to 2.4%.

2022 fire and outage
After a fire in its Seoul data center on 15 October 2022, KakaoTalk services were disrupted globally, its "worst-ever malfunction". President Yoon called for a quick resumption of services, which over 90% of Koreans use on a frequent basis. Services were partially restored within about 10 hours, but it took four days to repair servers and finally normalise operations. Messaging, as well as payments, banking, ride-hailing, maps, and games were disrupted. Kakao's co-CEO, Nam-koong Whon, resigned on 17 October 2022 because of the situation.

KakaoTalk API 
KakaoTalk made its platform API available for developers. The development stack currently supports iOS, Android, REST, and JavaScript. A user administration-based API and a push-based API are currently available, and an analytic API is planned for release.

Influence

Korean 
A solitary chat room is a kind of open chat room, where many anonymous people gather to talk about specific topics, communicating only with images, without using text or emoticons. In other words, it is making a story out of images only.
Similar chat rooms have sprung up as an open chat room that exchanges food pictures without a word became popular. As the popularity of the celebrity themed "solitary chat rooms" grew, celebrities went into the chat room themselves.

International 

KakaoTalk is available in 15 languages and used in over 130 countries.

On July 26, 2011, Kakao Corp. established Japanese Corp., Kakao Japan and appointed Cha-Jin Park as a representative. According to company officials, the app appears to be very actively used in Japan. When a massive earthquake hit Japan on March 11, 2011, KakaoTalk's messaging traffic in Japan surged as millions of people sought to confirm the safety of friends and family. KakaoTalk played an important role as a data network-based communication method; it successfully replaced disabled wired and wireless networks and helped connect the disaster-stricken.

KakaoTalk has targeted countries in Southeast Asia where no dominant mobile messenger service stands. KakaoTalk is forming strategic partnerships in Malaysia, Indonesia and the Philippines, as well.  In 2013, KakaoTalk began airing TV commercials in Indonesia, the Philippines, and Vietnam featuring Big Bang. In the ads, local celebrities and BigBang appear together to promote KakaoTalk. In late 2013, Indonesia became the country with the second-most users of KakaoTalk, after South Korea, with 13 million users and the potential to become KakaoTalk's largest market worldwide. The former co-CEO of KakaoTalk, Sirgoo Lee, stated "We grew our user base by more than 25 times in one year, so hopefully, we will continue at that rate." KakaoTalk has tailored their service to the local environment by collaborating with local designers and companies to generate "Indonesian-specific content".

In February 2014, KakaoTalk launched for Nokia Asha 500, 501, 502, and 503 devices, expanding its reach to users of a wider audience.

See also 

 Comparison of cross-platform instant messaging clients
Comparison of instant messaging protocols
Comparison of Internet Relay Chat clients
Comparison of LAN messengers
Comparison of VoIP software
List of SIP software
List of video telecommunication services and product brands

References

External links 
 
 KakaoTalk Case Study

Android (operating system) software
BlackBerry software
IOS software
Windows Phone software
Instant messaging clients
Cross-platform software
Communication software
South Korean brands
Kakao
2010 software